Ruan Tressoldi Netto (born 7 June 1999), sometimes known simply as Ruan, is a Brazilian professional footballer who plays as a centre-back for  Italian club Sassuolo.

Professional career
Ruan Tressoldi made his professional debut with Grêmio in a 4–3 Campeonato Brasileiro Série A loss to on 3 December 2017. 

On 11 August 2021, Ruan Tressoldi signed for Italian Serie A club Sassuolo on a deal reportedly worth €5 million; it was also confirmed that he would remain at Grêmio on loan until the end of 2021.

Personal life
Ruan Tressoldi's twin brother, Ramon Tressoldi, is also a footballer in Brazil.

Honours
Grêmio
Recopa Sudamericana: 2018
Campeonato Gaúcho: 2018, 2021

References

External links
 
 Grêmio Profile

1999 births
Living people
Sportspeople from Rio Grande do Sul
Brazilian footballers
Association football defenders
Campeonato Brasileiro Série A players
Serie A players
Esporte Clube Novo Hamburgo players
Grêmio Foot-Ball Porto Alegrense players
U.S. Sassuolo Calcio players
Brazilian expatriate footballers
Brazilian expatriate sportspeople in Italy
Expatriate footballers in Italy